Harry Everts (born February 1952) is a Belgian former professional motocross racer. He competed in the Motocross World Championships from 1970 to 1982. Everts is notable for being a four-time FIM motocross world champion. In 2013, he was named an FIM Legend for his motorcycling achievements.

Biography
Born in Maaseik, Belgium, Everts won the 1975 250cc motocross world championship as a member of the Puch factory racing team. After a period with Bultaco he signed with the Suzuki factory team and won three consecutive 125cc motocross world championships between 1979 and 1981. Everts was a member of the Belgian teams which won the Motocross des Nations in 1976 and 1979. He is the nephew of former professional motocross racer Jef Teuwissen and father of former ten-time motocross world champion, Stefan Everts.

References 

Living people
1952 births
People from Maaseik
Sportspeople from Limburg (Belgium)
Belgian motocross riders
Place of birth missing (living people)